Sportsvision (SV) was a subscription sports television service founded by Chicago White Sox owners Jerry Reinsdorf and Eddie Einhorn and media mogul Fred Eychaner. The service broadcast live sporting events, and for much of its time of operation was the broadcast network for the Chicago White Sox, Chicago Bulls, Chicago Blackhawks, and Chicago Sting.

In April 1982, WPWR-TV, then on Channel 60, dedicated a large percentage of its broadcast schedule to Sportsvision. To access the service, viewers had to buy a TV set-top converter and pay monthly subscription fees to watch a number of sports broadcasts. Ultimately, as cable television gained a foothold in the Chicago area, the pay-TV business model dissolved and, in January 1984, Sportsvision was sold to Cablevision and was moved to basic cable. In 1989, it was unscrambled and renamed SportsChannel. In 1997, SportsChannel was purchased by Fox Sports Net. Now starting in October 2004 through current day the games reside on Comcast Sports Network Chicago which is owned by Chicago sports owners and Comcast's NBC venture.

References 

 Myslenski, Skip. "TV, Radio map out contingency plans" Chicago Tribune August 6, 1985
 Craig, Jack. "Einhorn bets on live cable TV" Boston Globe November 29, 1981
 Polzin, Elmer. "Arlington may try pay-TV" Chicago Tribune May 18, 1982
 Perricone, Mike. "Hawks Notes" Chicago Sun-Times April 7, 1986

American subscription television services
Television channels and stations established in 1982
Television channels and stations disestablished in 1989
Defunct television stations in the United States
Sports in Chicago
SportsChannel
Joint ventures
Chicago White Sox